San Cristóbal is the top female volleyball team of San Cristóbal, Dominican Republic.

History
The team was founded in 2007.

Current volleyball squad
As of December 2008

Coach:  Eddy Moya Marte

Assistant coach:  Julio Baldera

Palmares

National competition 
National league

2007 - 4th Place
2008 - 2nd Place

References
League Official website

Dominican Republic volleyball clubs
Volleyball clubs established in 2007